The eighth season of NYPD Blue premiered on ABC on January 9, 2001, and concluded on May 22, 2001.

Episodes

References

NYPD Blue seasons
2001 American television seasons